Burdine is a feminine name that is considered to be English in origin. It is also considered to be a surname.

People 
 Burdine Maxwell, a character on Bratz
 Burdine Chong-Yu, a character on Spider-Man by Marvel Comics
 William Burdine Blake, Sr., an American music composer and newspaper publisher
 Greg Burdine (1959-2020), American politician

Other 
 Burdine, Kentucky, unincorporated community, United States
 Burdine Stadium, renamed to Miami Orange Bowl, the home stadium for the University of Miami Hurricanes football team, and named for Roddy Burdine.
 Burdines, a Florida department store chain, United States
 Burdinne, a municipality in Belgium, in the province of Liège

English given names
Feminine given names